The Ekolot KR-010 Elf is a Polish mid-wing, single-seat motor glider, produced by Ekolot of Krosno. It is the successor to the Ekolot JK 01A Elf. It was designed by Jerzy Krawczyk. It employs flaperons.

Specifications (KR-010 Elf)

See also

References

External links

Polish sailplanes
Homebuilt aircraft
Ekolot aircraft